Aacharya is a 2006 Indian Tamil-language gangster drama film written and directed by Ravi, an erstwhile assistant of director Bala. The film stars Vignesh and newcomer Divya, with Nassar, Charan Raj, Vadivukkarasi, Ganja Karuppu, Thennavan, Devan and C. Ezhumalai playing supporting roles. It was released on 23 June 2006.

Plot
Yadhunandhan is born in a very poor Brahmin family. He lived in an Agraharam in Mannargudi, and he had to go on a daily alms round to collect food. His father left the family at an early age, and his mother died shortly after; a kind-hearted muslim man took the young Yadhunandhan with him and became his adoptive father.

Many years later, the pious Yadhunandhan comes to the city Madurai with his degrees in hand to look for a job. One night, the thief Kokki steals Yadhunandhan's bag, and the police arrest the innocent Yadhunandhan for no particular reason. The police inspector Sivanandi has sympathy for the Yadhunandhan, so he offers him a temporary job. Yadhunandhan does all the dirty work in the police station. He gets his daily food and sleeps in the station. The situation forces the police inspector Sivanandi there to plead Yadhunandhan to accept a crime that he has not committed. In jail, Yadhunandhan crosses over Kokki, who advises him to stay away from the police and convinces him to meet Mayakka. Upon release from prison, he meets Mayakka, the authoritarian gang leader, who lords over the market. Impressed by Yadhunandhan's kind words, Mayakka takes him under her wings and gives him a place to live. Yadhunandhan is now called Saamy. The soft-spoken Yadhunandhan easily befriends with Mayakka's gang members, and Yadhunandhan discovers that Mayakka is, in fact, a kind-hearted person who joined the underworld for a living after the murder of her rowdy husband.

Mayakka, along with six others, works for the local bigwig Annavi Thevar, an influential and intimidating figure. Annavi Thevar rules the criminal underworld of the city, and even the police department is afraid of Annavi Thevar. In the meantime, Yadhunandhan and Devakosa Mangai fall in love with each other. Yadhunandhan then helps her to get selected as police officer thanks to Annavi Thevar's influence. Koorumathi is a gang leader who wants to control Mayakka's market, so Koorumathi and his henchmen brutally murder Mayakka in broad daylight. Thereafter, SP Thiruvasagam advises Koorumathi to surrender. Yadhunandhan, who was a pacifist and God-fearing man, decides to kill Koorumathi with the help of his friends for murdering Mayakka. On his way to the magistrate's house, Koorumathi is killed by Yadhunandhan in cold blood.

The murders of Mayakka and Koorumathi, therefore, trigger a brutal gang war, and the police have been overtaken by the events. The government has given free rein to the police to stop the gang war and to encounter all the rowdies. Yadhunandhan and his friends have no choice but to hide from the police. Yadhunandhan then realises that Annavi Thevar sells out to the police to save his life. Sivanandi then arrests Yadhunandhan but instead of encounter him, he sends him to jail, because Sivanandi felt guilty for sending the innocent Yadhunandhan in jail in the past. Devakosa Mangai becomes a police officer and swears to Yadhunandhan that she will save him at any cost. Thiruvasagam wants Yadhunandhan to disclose the place where the other rowdies are hiding. Yadhunandhan then convinces him to not kill the rowdies but to punish Annavi Thevar, who is the real culprit of this mess. Yadhunandhan swears that the other rowdies and he will testify against Annavi Thevar. At the court, two killers and a mole in the police department, appointed by Annavi Thevar, try to attack Yadhunandhan, but they fail. In a desperate move to save Annavi Thevar, his faithful henchman Pammathan threatens to shoot if the police don't release Annavi Thevar, Thiruvasagam shoots him in the leg, and Pammathan then triggers his gun. The bullet hits Devakosa Mangai in the head, and she dies on the spot. The film ends with Yadhunandhan bursting into tears, and his adoptive father takes Yadhunandhan with him.

Cast

Production
Ravi, who entered the cinema field, came from director Bala's school of learning. With his first film, Acharya, with actor Vignesh, Ravi is sure of his capabilities and believes in producing a good product. Based on a true-life story, director Ravi said to have chosen an interesting line and is treating it very naturally. That the written permission has been obtained from those whose characters are to be projected (they are all still living) is an interesting aside. Actor Vignesh signed to play the lead role of a Brahmin who tries hard to uphold the rituals and traditions that are fast disappearing.

Soundtrack

The film score and the soundtrack were composed by Srikanth Deva. The soundtrack, released in 2006, features 8 tracks with lyrics written by Na. Muthukumar.

Reception
P. V. Sathish Kumar wrote, "Even if Ravi steers the narrative towards the inevitable cornball conclusion with little care for subtlety, Aacharya is still most certainly a movie worth watching". Sify stated, "Vadivukarasi as Mayakka is simply superb and Charanraj as cop is good. For Vignesh, it is a comeback vehicle and he has done his best while Nassar is riveting as the guy with negative shades" and concluded that the film "is one of the better movies in the gangster genre".

Indiaglitz.com wrote, "Ravi has proved that he has the fire in him to make offbeat entertainers. A welcome addition to the directors keen on rendering movies on new themes". Another critic gave the film a mixed review, and criticized the film's rushed ending. A reviewer from tamilcinema.com wrote, "Aacharya is somewhat different and more fast-paced than the typical action films, it will be a successful film."

References

External links

2006 films
2000s Tamil-language films
Indian gangster films
2006 action drama films
Indian action drama films
Films scored by Srikanth Deva
Films about organised crime in India
2006 directorial debut films